Victory Birdseye (December 25, 1782 – September 16, 1853) was an American politician and a U. S. Representative from New York.

Biography
Birdseye was born in Cornwall, Litchfield County, Connecticut attended the public schools at Cornwall, Connecticut. He graduated from Williams College in 1804. Then he studied law, was admitted to the bar in 1807, and commenced practice in partnership with Daniel Wood, Esquire, in Pompey Hill, New York until 1814. In 1813, he married  Electa Beebee of Pompey. His daughter Ellen Douglas Birdseye married abolitionist Charles Augustus Wheaton. His great-grandson Clarence Birdseye developed the process for freezing food and founded Birds Eye Frozen Foods.

Career
Elected as a Democratic-Republican to the 14th United States Congress, Birdseye held the office of United States Representative for the nineteenth district of New York from March 4, 1815, to March 3, 1817.

Birdseye was Postmaster of Pompey Hill from 1817 to 1838, D.A. of Onondaga County from 1818 to 1833, and a delegate to the New York State Constitutional Convention of 1821. He was a member of the New York State Assembly (Onondaga Co.) in 1823, and of the New York State Senate (7th D.) in 1827.

Birdseye served as the special counsel to conduct prosecution in the trial of parties for the alleged abduction of William Morgan, a man who threatened exposure of the Freemason's secrets and whose disappearance brought about powerful anti-masonic sentiments in the U.S., sparking the formation of the Anti-Masonic Party.

Birdseye was again a member of the State Assembly in 1838 and 1840. While serving the latter term, Birdseye drafted and ushered through a bill that provided for the rescue of New York State citizens who had been kidnapped and sold into slavery.
 Under the provisions of that law, Solomon Northup, who had been enslaved in Louisiana, was restored to freedom in 1853.

Elected as a Whig to the 27th United States Congress, Birdseye held the office of U. S. Representative for the twenty-third district of New York from March 4, 1841, to March 3, 1843. Afterwards he resumed the practice of law.

Death
He died on September 16, 1853, in Pompey, Onondaga County, New York; and was buried at the Pompey Hill Cemetery there.

References

External links

1782 births
1853 deaths
19th-century American politicians
People from Cornwall, Connecticut
Democratic-Republican Party members of the United States House of Representatives from New York (state)
Whig Party members of the United States House of Representatives from New York (state)
Members of the New York State Assembly
New York (state) state senators
County district attorneys in New York (state)
People from Pompey, New York
Williams College alumni